Bhuvana Chandra is an Indian lyricist, renowned for his work in the Telugu cinema. He served in the Indian Air Force for 18 years before turning into a lyricist. He penned lyrics for more than 2000 songs. He also wrote more than 100 stories, a novel, and many articles in magazines. He participated as a judge in some reality shows. He also acted in the film Welcome Obama directed by Singeetam Srinivasa Rao.

Personal life 

Bhuvana Chandra was born in Gullapudi, Krishna district and brought up in Chintalapudi, West Godavari district of Andhra Pradesh. He used to frequent the library and read a lot of books since his childhood. He learned Typing, and Shorthand and held tuition for students to make a living. Along with a friend, he went for the selections of Indian Air Force and got selected. His first posting was in Delhi. He served in the Indian Air Force and took voluntary retirement before turning into a lyricist. He participated in the Indo-Pakistan war in 1971 and received 4 medals.

Career 
With the help of writer Tenneti Hemalatha, he met film directors Jandhyala, and Relangi Narasimha Rao. They wanted to talk to him later. With the help of another friend, he met film maker Vijaya Bapineedu. He challenged him to write lyrics for a situation and impress him, which he successfully completed. He made his debut as a lyricist with Vijaya Bapineedu's film Naku Pellam Kavali.

Later he wrote all the songs for Vijaya Bapineedu's next film Maa Inti Maharaju. Then he wrote three songs for Khaidi No. 786 which got him good recognition. Guvva Gorinkatho song from this movie became a big hit. The songs in the block buster film Gang Leader also got good fame.

Discography

As lyricist for straight films

As lyricist for dubbed films

Awards 
He received number of awards from different organizations.
 Kala Sagar Award
 Vamsee Award
 Kovvali Centenary Award
 Samudrala Award
 Vanguri Foundation Honour

Notes

References

External links 
 

1949 births
Living people
Telugu-language lyricists
Indian lyricists
People from Krishna district
Telugu male actors
Indian male film actors
Male actors in Telugu cinema
Male actors from Andhra Pradesh
Indian songwriters
21st-century Indian male actors